The Stinking Old Ninth is a Chinese dysphemism for intellectuals used at two major points.

The term originated during the Yuan dynasty where the Mongol conquerors identified ten "castes" of Chinese: bureaucrats, officials, Buddhist monks, Taoist priests, physicians, workers, hunters, prostitutes, (ninth) Confucian scholars and finally beggars, with only beggars at a status below the intellectuals. The Yuan dynasty believed that Confucian scholars did not bring productivity to society and even hindered the development of the economy, so it was classified as the ninth social class at that time. In the 1960s and 1970s, the term "Stinking Old Ninth" was often used as a synonym for intellectuals, and it expressed society's disgust at the time. Intellectuals were distrusted during the revolution and pushed to undergo self-transformation.

During the Cultural Revolution the "Nine Black Categories" were landlords, rich farmers, anti-revolutionaries, bad influences, right-wingers, traitors, spies, capitalist roaders and (ninth) intellectuals. While often attributed to Mao Zedong, in 1977 Deng Xiaoping argued that it was the Gang of Four who came up with the phrase and that Mao himself saw intellectuals as having some value in society.

See also 

 Five Black Categories

References

Cultural Revolution
Chinese words and phrases
Dysphemisms
Ideology of the Chinese Communist Party
Political repression in China
Persecution of intellectuals